Nakivubo War Memorial Stadium, commonly referred to as Nakivubo Stadium, is a multi-purpose stadium in Kampala, Uganda. It is currently not in use but was previously used mostly for football matches and served as the home venue of SC Villa. The stadium had a capacity of 30,000 people, after the 2013 renovations, but prior to the ongoing 2017 renovations.

Location
The stadium is located in the Central Business District of Kampala City surrounded by Ham Shopping Grounds, within a walking distance from the New Taxi Park.

History
The stadium that was initially established in 1926, was improved and modernized in 1954 by the British colonial government to commemorate the lives of Ugandans killed during the Second World War following the passage of the "Nakivubo War Memorial Act" by the Parliament of Uganda.

In 2000, the stadium hosted a match of the Uganda national football team with all players wearing a FC Internazionale Milano jersey. They were fined for that.

In early 2013, the stadium was closed by the Uganda Revenue Authority for a period of about one month, over "accumulated debts." It was re-opened after payment arrangements had been agreed upon.

The stadium was also shut down in May 2011, but re-opened after only a week after payment plans were negotiated.

The stadium was reopened and hosted the third round, second leg of the CAF U-17 Championship, a game between Uganda and Zambia, on 27 September 2014.

Overview
Nakivubo Stadium was developed in 1926 on land donated by the Kabaka of Buganda at the time. It hosted its first match on 1 April 1926 between the Uganda National Team and the Under-18 National team of Uganda. It owned by the Government of Uganda and is operated by the Board of Trustees known as the "Registered Trustees of Nakivubo War Memorial Stadium", appointed by the Minister of Sports.

2017 Renovations
In 2017, major renovations began at the stadium, involving improvement to the grounds, increasing seating from 30,000 to 35,000 and the construction of retail shops inside the outside walls of the facility. The renovations are a joint venture between the government of Uganda and Ham Enterprises. ROKO Construction are carrying out the work, began in June 2017 and ongoing, at an estimated cost of US$49 million. SC Villa and Police SC moved their games as a result of the renovation.

References

External links
Nakivubo Stadium takes shape
First Lady makes maiden visit to check on the progress of Nakivubo stadium

Football venues in Uganda
Multi-purpose stadiums in Uganda
Sport in Kampala
1926 establishments in Uganda
Buildings and structures in Kampala